Slovenia is a nation state in southern Central Europe, located at the crossroads of main European cultural and trade routes. The economy of Slovenia is small, open, and export-oriented and has been strongly influenced by international conditions. It has been severely hurt by the Eurozone crisis, started in the late 2000s. The main economic field is services, followed by industry and construction.

For further information on the types of business entities in this country and their abbreviations, see "Business entities in Slovenia".

Notable firms 
This list includes notable companies with primary headquarters located in the country. The industry and sector follow the Industry Classification Benchmark taxonomy. Organizations which have ceased operations are included and noted as defunct.

See also 
 Economy of Slovenia
 List of banks in Slovenia

References

External links 
 Chamber of Commerce and Industry of Slovenia

 

Slovenia